Carcar–Barili Road is a road connecting the city and municipality of Carcar and Barili in the Philippines. The road forms a part of National Route 830 and is the only road assigned to National Route 83.

History
During late October 2016 as found in Google Maps street view, the road received its markers. In June 2022, N83 was one of the two routes (the other being a new portion of N81 that was carved out from secondary routes (N830) since the section connected Carcar and Barili, which both had a population of 80,000-100,000 people.

References

Roads in Cebu